Special nuclear material (SNM) is a term used by the Nuclear Regulatory Commission of the United States to classify fissile materials. The NRC divides special nuclear material into three main categories, according to the risk and potential for its direct use in a clandestine nuclear weapon or for its use in the production of nuclear material for use in a nuclear weapon.

Category I

Category I is strategic special nuclear material.

Uranium-235 (contained in highly enriched uranium: >20% or more 235U),
Uranium-233, or
Plutonium-239.

Category I, SSNM means SSNM in any combination in a quantity of

2 kilograms (4.4 pounds) or more of Pu-239; or
5 kilograms or more of U-235 (11 pounds; contained in uranium enriched to 20 percent or more in the U-235 isotope); or
2 kilograms (4.4 pounds) or more of U-233; or
5 kilograms (11 pounds) or more in any combination computed by the equation grams = (grams contained U-235) + 2.5 (grams U-233 + grams Pu-239).

This is often referred to as a formula quantity.

Category II

Category II is special nuclear material of moderate strategic significance.

Less than a formula quantity of strategic special nuclear material but more than 1,000 grams of uranium-235 (contained in uranium enriched to 20 percent or more in the U-235 isotope) or more than 500 grams of uranium-233 or plutonium-239, or in a combined quantity of more than 1,000 grams  (2.2 pounds) when computed by the equation grams = (grams contained U-235) + 2 (grams U-233 + grams Pu-239); or
10,000 grams (22 pounds) or more of uranium-235 (contained in uranium enriched to 10 percent or more but less than 20 percent in the U-235 isotope).

Category III

Category III is special nuclear material of low strategic significance.

Less than an amount of special nuclear material of moderate strategic significance (see category II above) but more than 15 grams (0.5oz) of uranium-235 (contained in uranium enriched to 20 percent or more in U-235 isotope) or 15 grams of uranium-233 or 15 grams of plutonium-239 or the combination of 15 grams when computed by the equation grams = (grams contained U-235) + (grams Pu-239) + (grams U-233); or
Less than 10,000 grams but more than 1,000 grams of uranium-235 (contained in uranium enriched to 10 percent or more but less than 20 percent in the U-235 isotope); or
10,000 grams or more of uranium-235 (contained in uranium enriched above natural but less than 10 percent in the U-235 isotope).

Uranium-235
Uranium-235 has different rules because it often is not in a pure form. Plutonium-239 is made in nuclear reactors by irradiating uranium-238 with neutrons, and uranium-233 is made the same way using thorium-232. Since they are different elements than the source material, they can be separated relatively easily through chemical differences. However, uranium-235 is produced from uranium ore, which contains 0.7% uranium-235 with most of the rest consisting of uranium-238. Since they are the same element, they behave in similar ways and must be separated by their slightly different atomic masses. This is far more difficult than chemical separation, so varying levels of uranium-238 may remain after the first enrichment. If uranium is highly enriched, it can be used to make a nuclear weapon.

Sources
Nuclear Regulatory Commission

References

 
Nuclear proliferation